Gravina di Catania is a comune (municipality) in the Metropolitan City of Catania in the Italian region Sicily, located about  southeast of Palermo and about  north of Catania.

Gravina di Catania borders the following municipalities: Catania, Mascalucia, Sant'Agata li Battiati, Tremestieri Etneo.

References

External links
 Official website

Cities and towns in Sicily